Butterfly's Tongue or Butterfly (may be more literally translated as "The Tongue of the Butterflies"), is a 1999 Spanish film directed by José Luis Cuerda. The film centers on Moncho (Manuel Lozano) and his coming-of-age experience in Galicia in 1936. Moncho develops a close relationship with his teacher Don Gregorio (Fernando Fernán Gómez), who introduces the boy to different things in the world. While the story centres on Moncho's ordinary coming-of-age experiences, tensions related to the looming Spanish Civil War periodically interrupt Moncho's personal growth and daily life.

The film is adapted from three short stories from the 1996 book  by Galician author Manuel Rivas. The short stories are "A lingua das bolboretas", "Un saxo na néboa", and "Carmiña".

The film received some critical acclaim. It was nominated for the 2000 Goya Award for Best Picture, and it won the Goya Award for Best Adapted Screenplay. Butterfly's Tongue also has a 96% rating on RottenTomatoes.com.

Cast
 Fernando Fernán Gómez as Don Gregorio
  as Moncho
 Elena Fernandez as Carmiña
  as Rosa
  as Ramón
  as Andrés

Plot
In a Galician town in the 1930s, a young boy, Moncho, goes to school for the first time and is taught by Don Gregorio about life and literature. At first, Moncho is afraid that the teachers will hit him, since that was the standard procedure, but he is relieved to discover that Don Gregorio does not hit his pupils. Don Gregorio is unlike the other teachers; he builds a special relationship with Moncho, teaching him to love learning. Don Gregorio teaches him about the butterfly’s tongue on a field trip through the woods, with Moncho having an asthma attack and being assisted by Don Gregorio. Don Gregorio also builds a special relationship with Moncho's father, who is a Republican like him. At this period in Spain, the Republican and the Nationalist factions are fighting a civil war, forcing people to take sides. Moncho's mother is lukewarm towards the Republic, her main concern being belief in God; she eventually sides with the Nationalist rebels.

When Nationalists take control of the town, they round up known Republicans, including Don Gregorio. As Moncho's father is a Republican, his family fears that he too will be arrested if the Nationalists discover his political leanings. In order to protect themselves, the family goes to the town square to jeer the captured Republicans as they are paraded out of the courthouse and put on a truck. The film ends with Moncho, despite his continued great affection for his friend and teacher, yelling hateful things and throwing rocks at Don Gregorio and the other Republicans, as instructed by his mother, as the truck carries them away, although the last thing Moncho yells are the words for the tongue of a butterfly, espiritrompa (Spanish for "proboscis"), a favorite word taught to him by Don Gregorio, in an attempt to let his dear friend know that he does not truly mean the words he is yelling.

References

External links

 
 

1999 films
Spanish war drama films
1990s Spanish-language films
Films about anarchism
Spanish Civil War films
Films set in Galicia (Spain)
Films with screenplays by Rafael Azcona
1990s Spanish films
Films directed by José Luis Cuerda